Mario Cavalla (22 March 1902 – 1 January 1962) was an Italian ski jumper. He competed in the individual event at the 1924 Winter Olympics.

References

1902 births
1962 deaths
Italian male ski jumpers
Olympic ski jumpers of Italy
Ski jumpers at the 1924 Winter Olympics
Place of birth missing